Fra Lippo Lippi is a Norwegian band. They had several hits in the 1980s, such as "Shouldn't Have to Be Like That", "Everytime I See You" and "Light and Shade", and recorded a new album as late as 2002. The band name is derived from Robert Browning's poem about the Renaissance painter Filippo Lippi.

History
Fra Lippo Lippi was founded in Nesodden, Norway in 1980 by Rune Kristoffersen (bass, guitar, keyboards), Morten Sjøberg (drums, keyboards) and Bjørn Sorknes (bass, keyboards). They released a 4-track instrumental EP that year, titled Tap Dance for Scientists. Two years prior, the group was writing and rehearsing under the name Genetic Control.

In 1981, Sorknes left as the band was writing songs for their debut album. The band, which then consisted of the duo of Kristoffersen and Sjøberg, recorded and released In Silence under Uniton Records. Inspired by British post-punk band Joy Division, the album received some favourable reviews and was distributed in several European countries. In the Netherlands and Belgium, it sold better than in their native Norway.

In 1982, Kristoffersen and Sjøberg began writing and recording their next album. A single, "Now and Forever", was released in April 1982. Their music developed into a more melodic sound and they realised that they needed to recruit a vocalist. In 1983, Per Øystein Sørensen came on board as the band's lead vocalist for their second album Small Mercies. The single "The Treasure", featuring a less dense, more melodic sound with piano as the central instrument, was a foretaste of album and the band's new sound. They now had a brighter, more pop-oriented sound and received a number of positive reviews in their home country and in the British music press.

In late 1983, they were joined by keyboardist Øyvind Kvalnes. Having previously performed live on only a few occasions with pre-recorded tapes, the band wished to develop their live sound, but Kvalnes also proved to make significant contributions to their songwriting. Their first release as a quartet was the single "Say Something" in 1984 on which former member Bjørn Sorknes guested on bass.

In 1985, their third album was recorded at Polar Studios in Stockholm. Having parted ways with Uniton, the band financed the recording themselves as there was no interest from any labels. It was released as Songs on their own Easter Productions label to positive reviews; some critics hailed it as the best pop album ever made in Norway and 5,000 copies were sold in Norway without the aid of singles or promotion.

Months after Songs was released, the band was signed to Virgin Records. At this point, Sjøberg and Kvalnes departed at the prospect of giving up their day jobs for the uncertain careers as professional musicians, leaving Kristoffersen and Sørensen as the only two members. Songs was re-recorded and remixed for the international market in 1986. This version of the album included a new song titled "Everytime I See You", a reworking of an earlier song, "A Small Mercy" from the album Small Mercies. The band also scored a hit single in Europe with "Shouldn't Have to Be Like That", a double A-side with "The Distance Between Us".

In 1987, the band recorded and released their follow-up album Light and Shade in Los Angeles, CA, with the producing aid of Walter Becker. The album received positive reviews, but was not the commercial success that was expected. Shortly after the album's release, they were dropped by Virgin Records.

The band however gained a huge popularity in the Philippines and prompted them to tour the country in 1988. In Manila, their shows sold out six times over two weekends.

The band continued to record and release further albums independently, starting with 1989's The Colour Album on the Swedish label The Record Station. A live album titled Crash of Light was released in the Philippines in 1990. In 1990, the band was dropped by The Record Station. The duo considered splitting up, but eventually decided to continue as Fra Lippo Lippi and released the self-produced album Dreams in 1992. The song "Stitches and Burns" became very popular in the Philippines. In 1995, the band released their first compilation album The Best of Fra Lippo Lippi '85–'95. Selected tracks originally from Songs, Light and Shade and The Colour Album were re-recorded. Two years later, another compilation was released in the Philippines. The Virgin Years - Greatest Hits featured tracks directly licensed from Virgin Records.

In 2002, Kristoffersen retired from the band to focus on his record label Rune Grammofon, and the band released In a Brilliant White which contains mostly Sorensen's works and was initially produced and released only in the Philippines. The first single "Later" became a hit in the Philippines even before the album was released, hence EMI Philippines (now PolyEast Records) decided to produce a full-length album with it. It also features a collaboration single "Wish We Were Two" featuring Per Sorensen and Kyla. This album was also released in Norway eventually, following releases over other countries in Asia.

In September 2009, Sørensen released Våge, his first solo album and his first-ever work in Norwegian. An English version titled Master of Imperfection was released in 2012.

Personnel

Current members
Per Øystein Sørensen – vocals (1982–present)

Former members
Rune Kristoffersen – bass, keyboards (1978–2002)
Morten Sjøberg – drums (1978–1985)
Øyvind Kvalnes – keyboards (1984–1985)
Bjørn Sorknes – keyboards, guitar, vocals (1978–1981)

Discography

Albums
In Silence (1981)
Small Mercies (1983)
Songs (1985)
Songs – International version (1986)
Light and Shade (1987)
The Colour Album (1989)
Crash of Light (1989)
Dreams (1992)
In a Brilliant White (2002)

Compilations
The Best of Fra Lippo Lippi '85–'95 (1995)
The Virgin Years – Greatest Hits (1997)
The Early Years (2003) - Re-release of In Silence and Small Mercies
The Best of Fra Lippo Lippi (2005)
The Essential Fra Lippo Lippi: Essence & Rare (2005)
Fra Lippo Lippi (2011) – 4 album Box Set
Rarum 80-95 (2018) – Singles rarities 1980–1995

Singles and EPs
Tap Dance for Scientists (1980)
"In Silence" (1981)
"Now and Forever" (1982)
"A Small Mercy" (1982)
"The Treasure" (1983)
"Say Something" (1984)
"Leaving" (1985)
"Shouldn't Have to Be Like That"/"The Distance Between Us" (1986) - NOR #4, NETH #29, BEL #39, UK #81
"Everytime I See You" (1986)
"Come Summer" (1986)
"Light and Shade" (1987)
"Angel" (1987)
"Beauty and Madness" (1988)
"Some People" (1988)
"Count on Me" (1989)
"Love Is a Lonely Harbour" (1989)
"Mothers Little Soldier" (1990)
"Stitches and Burns" (1990)
"Thief in Paradise" (1992)
"Everybody Everywhere" (1995)
"Later" (2002)
"Story of a Broken Heart" (2002)

References

External links
Fra Lippo Lippi discography (Discogs)
Fra Lippo Lippi discography (blogspot)

1978 establishments in Norway
Norwegian gothic rock groups
Musical groups established in 1978
Musical groups from Akershus
Norwegian new wave musical groups
Norwegian post-punk music groups
Synth-pop new wave musical groups
Rune Grammofon artists
Virgin Records artists